Jonas de Geus (born 29 April 1998) is a Dutch field hockey player who plays as a midfielder for Kampong and the Dutch national team.

Club career
De Geus started playing hockey at Almere where he went through all the youth ranks until he made his debut for the first team. In April 2019, he announced he would leave Almere at the end of the season. One month later he signed a four-year contract at Kampong.

International career
In November 2016, de Geus was selected for the 2016 Junior World Cup, where the team finished seventh. He made his debut for the senior national team at the age of 18 in a test match against South Africa in 2017. He was part of the Dutch team that won the silver medal at the 2018 World Cup. In June 2019, he was selected in the Netherlands squad for the 2019 EuroHockey Championship. They won the bronze medal by defeating Germany 4–0. He was named the under-21 player of the tournament. In December 2019, he was nominated for the FIH Rising Star of the Year Award.

References

External links

1998 births
Living people
Field hockey players from Amsterdam
Dutch male field hockey players
Male field hockey midfielders
2018 Men's Hockey World Cup players
Field hockey players at the 2020 Summer Olympics
Olympic field hockey players of the Netherlands
SV Kampong players
Men's Hoofdklasse Hockey players
2023 Men's FIH Hockey World Cup players
21st-century Dutch people